Rachel Tseng (born 3 March 1998) is a Singaporean swimmer. She competed in the women's 200 metre freestyle event at the 2018 FINA World Swimming Championships (25 m), in Hangzhou, China.

References

External links
 

1998 births
Living people
Singaporean female freestyle swimmers
Place of birth missing (living people)
Swimmers at the 2014 Asian Games
Asian Games competitors for Singapore
21st-century Singaporean women